Les villes tentaculaires (sometimes rendered "The Great Cities" or "The Many-Tentacled Town") is a volume of Symbolist poetry in French by the Belgian Émile Verhaeren, first published in 1895 by Edmond Deman, with a frontispiece by Théo van Rysselberghe. It established the poet's European reputation, and his stature as "a true pioneer of Modernism". The loose theme of the collection is modern urban life and the transformation of the countryside by urban sprawl.

The theme of urban sprawl had already been broached in Verhaeren's 1893 collection Les campagnes hallucinées ("The hallucinated fields"). The two collections were generally printed together in one volume from 1904 onwards.

Contents
In the 18th edition of the joint publication Les Villes tentaculaires, précédées des Campagnes hallucinées (Paris, 1920), the poems included were as follows. A few of the poems have been published in English translation by Will Stone.

Les campagnes hallucinées

 La ville
 Les plaines
 Chanson de fou
 Le donneur de mauvais conseils
 Chanson de fou
 Pèlerinage
 Chanson de fou
 Les fièvres
 Chanson de fou
 Le péché
 Chanson de fou
 Les mendiants
 La kermesse
 Chanson de fou
 Le fléau
 Chanson de fou
 Le départ
 La bêche

Les villes tentaculaires
 La plaine
 L'âme de la ville
 Une statue
 Les cathédrales
 Une statue
 Le port
 Les spectacles
 Les promeneuses
 Une statue
 Les usines
 La bourse
 Le bazar
 L'étal
 La révolte
 Au musée
 Une statue
 La mort
 La recherche
 Les idées
 Vers le futur

References

1895 poetry books
French poetry collections
Symbolist literature
Works by Belgian writers